Damietta Sporting Club, is an Egyptian football club based in Damietta, Egypt. The club is currently playing in the Egyptian Third Division, the third-highest league in the Egyptian football league system.

Egyptian Second Division
Football clubs in Egypt
Association football clubs established in 1923
1923 establishments in Egypt